Zauichye is a rural locality (a village) in Sergeikhinskoye Rural Settlement, Kameshkovsky District, Vladimir Oblast, Russia. The population was 7 as of 2010.

Geography 
Zauichye is located on the Uyechka River, 23 km west of Kameshkovo (the district's administrative centre) by road. Pigasovo is the nearest rural locality.

References 

Rural localities in Kameshkovsky District
Suzdalsky Uyezd